Lycia ursaria, the stout spanworm moth or bear, is a moth of the family Geometridae. The species was first described by Francis Walker in 1860. It is found in southern Canada and the northern United States, south to New Jersey and Iowa.

The wingspan is about 45 mm. The forewings of the males are broad, evenly grey and heavily speckled with black. There are three black wavy lines on the wing. The hindwings are similar but are more muted in colour. The females have reduced wings and are incapable of flight. For a geometrid, this species has an unusually stout and hairy body. Adults are on wing from March to June in one generation per year.

The larvae feed on the leaves of various broadleaved trees and shrubs, including Alnus, Malus, Fraxinus, Tilia, Betula, Vaccinium, Cornus, Ulmus, Crataegus, Populus and Salix.

References

Moths described in 1857
Bistonini